is a Japanese name meaning 'base of bridge', from  'bridge' and  'base'. It may refer to:

Hashimoto (surname)
 Hashimoto, a place in the city of Sagamihara, Kanagawa, Japan
Hashimoto, Wakayama, a city in Wakayama Prefecture, Japan
Hashimoto-san, a fictional mouse appearing in Terrytoons theatrical cartoons

See also
 Hashimoto's thyroiditis, the most common form of thyroiditis
 Hashimoto's encephalopathy, a rare neuroendocrine disorder